Stagecoach Manchester is a major bus operator in Greater Manchester. It is the largest UK bus subsidiary of Stagecoach Group outside of Greater London, as well as the largest within the metropolitan county of Greater Manchester by passenger numbers, carrying up to 96.2 million passengers in 2019/20.
It is made up of two brands: Stagecoach and Magic Bus.

History

In December 1993, GM Buses was split into two companies: GM Buses North and GM Buses South. It was planned that the two companies would compete against one another but, in practice, they stuck to the sides of Manchester as indicated by their names.

In April 1994, GM Buses South was sold in a management buyout. It faced an uphill struggle as over 40 competitors were operating GM Buses routes following deregulation, although most of those competed with GM Buses North. However, Bee Line and MTL Manchester did go south; Finglands Coachways, Mayne and Walls were established competitors on lucrative south Manchester routes.

GMBS suffered from operating an elderly fleet. As a stand-alone (nil subsidy) arms-length company, GM Buses had not been able to buy new buses; thus Daimler Fleetlines and Leyland Atlanteans - the newest by then 15 years old - had to soldier on. Competitors were expanding and GMBS could not make the investment needed.

Stagecoach set up Stagecoach Manchester as a Ribble Motor Services subsidiary, to compete on GMBS's main route 192 with brand new Volvo B6 buses that were far more appealing than GMBS's rundown fleet.

In response to increasing competition by Merseyside Transport, GMBS set up Birkenhead & District in Liverpool, running Daimler Fleetlines in Birkenhead Corporation livery.

Throughout 1994, GMBS bought a large number of second hand buses, mainly Atlanteans and Leyland Nationals. Stagecoach responded with more new buses in the shape of new Alexander PS bodied Volvo B10M-55s. GMBS used its Charterplan coach fleet to compete with Stagecoach Ribble's route X43 to Burnley. By the end of 1994, everything turned peaceful; Stagecoach agreed to no further competition on route 192 and hired 20 Alexander Dash bodied Volvo B6s to GMBS.

In February 1996, Stagecoach purchased the business and rebranded it Stagecoach Manchester. The original Stagecoach Manchester was sold to Finglands Coachways.

On 21 January 2008, Stagecoach Manchester purchased the bus operations of A Mayne & Son, with 38 buses all transferred to Hyde Road garage.

On 10 August 2008, Stagecoach Manchester purchased the bus operations of Bullocks Coaches. Bullocks retained their coach hire business and route 147 Oxford Road Link operated as a subsidised university and hospital link. Bullocks' services included route 157, between Woodford and Manchester, which has since been renumbered X57 and made limited stop between East Didsbury and Manchester.

In March 2011, Stagecoach started running the Stockport Metroshuttle service.

On 2 December 2012, Stagecoach Manchester purchased First Greater Manchester's Wigan operation. The transaction saw 300 employees, 120 vehicles (although 20 were owned by Transport for Greater Manchester) and the Wigan depot purchased by the former Mayne legal entity. The business was rebranded Stagecoach in Wigan although it is managed by Stagecoach Manchester.

On 3 March 2013, Stagecoach purchased Bluebird with 40 buses, 80 staff and its depot lease at Greengate. On 26 April 2014, Stagecoach took over the business of JPT Bus Company with 41 buses.

The first autonomous bus trial in the United Kingdom commenced in mid-2019, with an Alexander Dennis Enviro200 MMC single-decker bus modified with autonomous software from Fusion Processing able to operate in driverless mode within Stagecoach Manchester's Sharston bus depot, performing tasks such as driving to the washing station, refuelling point and then parking up at a dedicated parking space in the depot.

Franchising 
In 2019, it was announced that the Greater Manchester Combined Authority (GMCA) would be looking into improving the public transport network in Greater Manchester with bus franchising as the preferred option by both itself and Transport for Greater Manchester (TfGM). This announcement concerned bus operators including Stagecoach who alongside OneBus started to publish their own facts and research into Manchester's bus network with a detailed partnership proposal to work with the GMCA and TfGM to improve the bus network at no cost to local taxpayers as the investment would come from the private sector. In September 2019, Stagecoach decided to increase their advertising of their Partnership proposal with bus advertising and a dedicated website.

Depots
Ashton-under-Lyne (Riverside, Clarence Street)
Manchester (Hyde Road, Ardwick)
Manchester (Sharston)
Middleton (Greengate) - Bluebird operations taken over 3 March 2013
Stockport (Daw Bank)
Wigan (Bryn Lockett Road) - First Greater Manchester's Wigan operations taken over 2 December 2012

Services
Stagecoach Manchester operates the largest number of services of any bus operator in Greater Manchester. It is primarily dominant in southern areas of the county but in recent years has gradually expanded its operations north of Manchester city centre operating some cross-city services.

Stagecoach in Manchester

Stagecoach in Manchester mainly run services in the southern areas of Greater Manchester, serving Stockport, Trafford, Tameside and south and central Manchester. They also run some local services in Glossop. Stagecoach does run some services outside these areas: 
50 East Didsbury - Manchester - Salford Quays, which became Manchester's first cross-city service for nearly two decades
76 Oldham - Manchester
156 Middleton-Crumpsall-Blackley-Manchester

From March 2013, Stagecoach moved further into north Manchester by purchasing Bluebird.

Since 23 July 2017, the 22 route (Bolton – Stockport) that Stagecoach Manchester shared with First Greater Manchester has been separated into two routes. The 2 route operates between Bolton and the Trafford Centre and is operated by First Greater Manchester. The 25 route operates between Stockport and the Trafford Centre, and is operated by Stagecoach Manchester and Manchester Community Transport.

Stagecoach in Wigan

Since December 2012, Stagecoach has operated services in the Wigan area under the brandname Stagecoach in Wigan, following the purchase of First Greater Manchester's Wigan operation. Services from Wigan depot mainly run in the Wigan and Leigh areas, whilst also serving Manchester and Salford on routes 33 and 34/X34 (the former being shared with First Greater Manchester), while route 7 (formally 540) runs to Bolton, which is also served by Stagecoach Lancashire route 125. Route 113 is operated from both Stagecoach Manchester's Wigan depot and Stagecoach Lancashire's Chorley depot.

Magic Bus
 
The Magic Bus brand was introduced by Stagecoach Manchester to the Wilmslow Road bus corridor to compete against other cheaper bus brands. It offered lower fares than on regular Stagecoach liveried services by using older bus type fleets. The Manchester Magic Bus fleet currently consists of older Alexander Dennis Enviro 400s transferred from the Stagecoach in Manchester fleet, operating on Wilmslow Road routes 142, 143 and 147.

In 2006 the Magic Bus brand was introduced in Manchester on route 192 to counter a bus war started by UK North. Following UK North being de-licensed, the Magic Bus ceased operating on route 192 with all services provided by Stagecoach liveried buses.

Nightbus
Stagecoach Manchester offer several night bus services in Manchester and Wigan every Friday and Saturday night. The services run every 30 minutes or every hour from 00:00 until 03:00 and the routes are mainly the same as the normal routes with some exceptions.

Stagecoach also operates night bus services in Wigan. The network is largely based on the main Wigan services with some running an amended route to its normal routes. Wigan's Nightbus network runs on Friday nights/Saturday mornings and Saturday nights/Sunday mornings. The services also operate on New Year's Eve with additional journeys during the evening between 19:00 and 23:00, along with journeys on Arriva North West's route 352 to Orrell and 362 to Standish and on Wigan Buses/Maytree Travel route 612 to Wrightington Hospital. 53 and 88 are examples even though at daytime they are First Greater Manchester buses.

Fleet

Stagecoach Manchester currently operate a fleet of 812 buses and 37 coaches (run on school services), which includes one of the largest fleet of Alexander Dennis Enviro400 double-decker buses for any bus operator in the UK. These also include a range of Hybrid variants:

32  Zero emission, electric double decker buses
138 Euro 4 and 5 Hybrid buses
1 Euro 6 Hybrid bus
172 Euro 6 buses(as of April 2019).

Most Stagecoach Manchester vehicles are branded in the now 20-year-old Beach Ball design corporate livery, originally launched in 2000. The livery consists of vehicles painted white, with a blue skirt, and red and orange swoops.

The new Stagecoach livery was launched in January 2020, and features three different liveries, based on the type of service operated: local, long-distance and specialist. These new designs are to be applied beginning in the latter half of 2020.

See also
Timeline of public passenger transport operations in Manchester

Publications
Celebrating 100 Years of Princess Road Manchester: Stagecoach April 2010

References

External links

Company website

Bus operators in Greater Manchester
Stagecoach Group bus operators in England
Transport companies established in 1996
Transport in Manchester
1996 establishments in England